Sunny Valley Preserve is  composed of nature preserve parcels in New Milford, Connecticut and Bridgewater, Connecticut, Litchfield County, Connecticut, United States. as well as one agricultural operation (farm).

Sunny Valley Preserve is owned by The Nature Conservancy.

Hiking
The Sunny Valley Preserve parcels and farm contain several trails and hiking is open to the public. Camping is not allowed on the preserve's property.

References

External links
 
 

 

Bridgewater, Connecticut
New Milford, Connecticut
Parks in Litchfield County, Connecticut
Blue-Blazed Trails
Protected areas of Litchfield County, Connecticut